The 46th Separate Airmobile Brigade is a brigade of the Ukrainian Air Assault Forces formed in 2016, based in Poltava.

History 
The United Kingdom offered the Ukrainian government training on British soil for Ukrainian recruits, and the 46th Air Assault Brigade was one of the selected brigades. Fresh Western supplies, like as Wolfhound MRAPs and Husky TSV tactical vehicles, were also delivered to the brigade. The Brigade was converted from a heavy assault brigade to a light assault brigade. The 46th Airmobile Brigade took part in the Kherson operation after arriving from the United Kingdom. The Brigade no longer uses equipment built in the Soviet Union or Ukraine, such as BTR-3s, BMP-1s, or T-80s.

The Brigade from Poltava was dubbed the 46th Airmobile Brigade. The unit also got a new emblem.

The unit has been an integral part of the defense in Bakhmut and in Soledar, both of which have been the site of some of the most intense fighting in the war.

Structure 
As of 2022 the brigade's structure is as follows:

 46th Air Assault Brigade, Poltava
 Headquarters & Headquarters Company
 1st Battalion
 2nd Battalion
 3rd Battalion
 Tank Company (equipped with T-80BV)
 Artillery Group (equipped with 2S1 and BM-21 Grad)
 Reconnaissance Company
 Anti-Aircraft Company (equipped with Shilka)
 Support units (including engineers, communication, medics, and material support)

References 

Brigades of the Ukrainian Air Assault Forces
Military units and formations established in 2016
Airborne infantry brigades
2016 establishments in Ukraine
Military units and formations of the 2022 Russian invasion of Ukraine